Laurens Devos (born 15 August 2000) is a Belgian table tennis player who was the Paralympic champion in men's singles class 9. He has also won four European titles and most recently, a world title for his country.

Laurens Devos lives in Oostmalle. The son of Mario Devos and Christel, he has 2 brothers and a twin sister, Isabel. His 6 years older brother Robin Devos is as of 14 September 2016 the second-highest ranked able-bodied Belgian table tennis player, ranked number 119 on the World Ranking.

Caused by a lack of oxygen at birth, Laurens suffers from mild hemiplegia which results in a loss of mobility on the right side of his body. He plays left-handed. He studies at the Topsportschool in Leuven, where he is the only student with a disability.

Sporting career
Laurens Devos was ranked world number 2 in his class before going to the Paralympics. In 2014 he won the GDF Suez Trophy (the award for most promising young Belgian para-athlete). He won the 2015 European Championships in Vejle, Denmark. He is national table tennis champion in his age category (able-bodied category).

With his victory over Dutch Gerben Last in 3 straight sets, Devos became the youngest player ever to win table tennis gold at the Paralympics.

At the 2016 ITTF Star Awards, Devos won Male Para Table Tennis Star, the award for Paralympic table tennis player of the year.

Devos reached the first round of the 2016 World Junior Table Tennis Championships, but then lost 4-3 from the Austrian Andreas Levenko.

On 17 December 2016, Devos was named the Paralympian of the Year at the Belgian Sportsman of the year ceremony.

He won his first world championship title in 2018 in Lasko, Slovenia by defeating Iurii Nozdrunov of Russia.

External links
 Laurens Devos - Cœur Handisport

Notes

Living people
2000 births
Paralympic table tennis players of Belgium
Paralympic gold medalists for Belgium
People from Malle
Paralympic medalists in table tennis
Medalists at the 2016 Summer Paralympics
Belgian male table tennis players
Table tennis players at the 2016 Summer Paralympics
Table tennis players at the 2020 Summer Paralympics
Sportspeople from Antwerp Province